The Blies is a right tributary of the Saar in southwestern Germany (Saarland) and northeastern France (Moselle). The Blies flows from three springs in the Hunsrück near Selbach, Germany. It is roughly 100 km long, ending in the French city of Sarreguemines. It flows through Sankt Wendel, Ottweiler, Neunkirchen, Bexbach, Homburg and Blieskastel (Blieskastel being named after the river). Its lower extent demarcates part of the Franco–German border.

Tributaries
Tributaries of the Blies are, from source to mouth:

Todbach (left)
Oster (left)
Mutterbach (right)
Erbach (left)
Lambsbach (left)
Schwarzbach (left)
Würzbach (right)
Hetschenbach (left)
Gailbach (left)
Mandelbach (right)

World War II
Fighting took place on the Blies during the Lorraine Campaign, fought from September to December 1944 by the Third United States Army, famously led by George S. Patton. The 35th Infantry Division fought along the Blies following its battle at Sarreguemines in early December, the former part of the larger assault on the West Wall.

See also
Blies-Ébersing (Fr)
Blies-Schweyen (Fr)
Blies-Guersviller (Fr)
List of rivers of Saarland

References

External links

Rivers of France
Rivers of Saarland
International rivers of Europe
France–Germany border
Neunkirchen, Saarland
 
Rivers of Grand Est
Rivers of Moselle (department)
Rivers of Germany
Border rivers